Eleazar was a Jewish High Priest (c. 260–245 BC) during the Second Temple period. He was the son of Onias I and brother of Simon I.

Eleazar was the high priest involved in communication with Ptolemy II Philadelphus discussed in the Letter of Aristeas. According to the letter, Eleazar sent seventy two scholars, six from each of the tribes of Israel to the island of Pharos, in order to provide the Library of Alexandria with a Greek translation of the Hebrew Law, also called the Septuagint.

He was succeeded by his uncle Manasseh.

Patrilineal Ancestry

Abraham
Isaac
Jacob
Levi
Kohath
Amram
Aaron
Eleazar
Phinehas
Abishua
Bukki
Uzzi
Zerahiah
Meraioth
Amariah
Ahitub
Zadok
Ahimaaz
Azariah
Johanan
Azariah
Amariah
Ahitub
Zadok II
Shallum
Hilkiah
Azariah
Seraiah
Jehozadak
Joshua the High Priest
Joiakim
Eliashib
Joiada
Johanan
Jaddua
Onias I

See also
List of High Priests of Israel

References

3rd-century BCE High Priests of Israel
Septuagint